The Commander-in-Chief's Trophy is awarded to each season's winner of the American college football series among the teams of the U.S. Military Academy (Army Black Knights), the U.S. Naval Academy (Navy Midshipmen), and the U.S. Air Force Academy (Air Force Falcons).

The Navy–Air Force game is normally played on the first Saturday in October, the Army–Air Force game on the first Saturday in November, and the Army–Navy Game on the second Saturday in December.  In the event of a tie, the award is shared, but the previous winner retains physical possession of the trophy. The Commander-in-Chief's Trophy and the Michigan MAC Trophy are the only NCAA Division I FBS triangular rivalry trophies awarded annually. The few others, such as the Florida Cup and the Beehive Boot, are contested sporadically.

Through 2022, the Air Force Falcons hold the most trophy victories with 21. The Navy Midshipmen have won 16. The Army Black Knights trail with 9. The trophy has been shared on five occasions, most recently in 2021.

History of the trophy
Air Force first played Army in 1959 and Navy in 1960. Prior to 1972, Air Force met Army in odd years and Navy in even years (and neither in 1961,  1972 was the first year the trophy was awarded, and Air Force has played both Army and Navy every year since. Because Air Force played Army and not Navy in 1971, the Army-Air Force game is the longest uninterrupted intersectional rivalry in college football by one game over the Air Force-Navy game.

 trophy was the brainchild of Air Force General George B. Simler, a former Air Force Academy athletic director who envisioned the trophy as a means to create an annual series of football games for the Air Force Academy against the Military Academy and the Naval Academy. First awarded in 1972 by President Richard Nixon, the trophy itself is jointly sponsored by the alumni associations of the three academies.

The trophy is named for the U.S. President, who is the Commander-in-Chief of all U.S. military services under the U.S. Constitution. The President has personally awarded the trophy on a number of occasions. During the 1980s, for instance, President Ronald Reagan presented the award in an annual White House ceremony. In 1996, President Bill Clinton presented the trophy to the Army team at Veterans Stadium after the Army–Navy Game.  From 2003 to 2007, President George W. Bush presented the trophy to Navy teams at ceremonies in the White House.

During the late 1980s and early 1990s, the winner of the trophy, if bowl eligible, was granted an invitation to the Liberty Bowl in Memphis, Tennessee.

Navy was the first to five wins in 1981, while Army won its fifth in 1988 and Air Force in 1989 to knot the series (five wins each with three shares). Air Force has led since their win in 1990, and dominated through 2002, with sixteen wins to Army's six. Winless in the series for over two decades, Navy reeled off seven consecutive sweeps from 2003 through 2009 to draw close.

In the annual series, Air Force plays a home game and a road game, usually both on campus, hosting Navy in even-numbered years and Army in odd years. Exceptions have included Air Force playing Navy at Jack Kent Cooke Stadium in Maryland in 1999 and Army at Globe Life Field in Texas in 2021. Army–Navy is a neutral site game, usually in a major eastern metropolitan area and most frequently in Philadelphia. Home games for Army–Navy are usually the result of circumstance, such as the 1942 and 1943 editions being moved to Annapolis and West Point due to World War II and 2020 at Army's campus because of the COVID-19 pandemic.

The other two federal service academies – the U.S. Coast Guard Academy and U.S. Merchant Marine Academy – do not participate in this competition.  They are approximately one-quarter the size of the three Department of Defense (DoD) academies and compete in Division III athletics, so they do not compete against the DoD military academies in most sports. The Coast Guard Bears and Merchant Marine Mariners have an annual football rivalry for the Secretaries Cup.

The trophy has been the subject of at least one "spirit mission," or prank, leading up to a service academy rivalry game. In late November 2019, a group of Naval Academy midshipmen stole the CIC trophy from West Point (who had won it the previous year) and transported it to Annapolis. The prank was revealed when the trophy was placed on display at noon meal in front of the Brigade of Midshipmen at USNA. The event received significant attention on social media platforms. Upon West Point leadership learning of the incident, the trophy was promptly returned to USMA. It is not known how the trophy was stolen and transported, and neither Academy provided an official comment on the incident. Navy went on to win the CIC trophy following a 31–7 victory against Army on December 14, 2019.

The trophy
The design consists of three silver footballs in a pyramid-like arrangement, set on a circular base, with three arc-shaped sections cut out – one for each academy. In each of the cut-out areas stands a silver figurine of the mascot of one of the academies, in front of small, engraved plates denoting which years the respective academy has won the trophy. Beneath each of the three silver footballs is the crest of one of the three academies.

When Air Force has possession of the trophy, it is displayed in a glass case in the Cadet Fieldhouse, the indoor sports complex at the Air Force Academy. When Navy has possession of the trophy, it is displayed in a glass case in Bancroft Hall, the Midshipmen's dormitory. When Army possesses the trophy, it is housed in a glass case outside the football offices in the Army West Point Sports Hall of Fame, part of the Kimsey Athletic Center in Michie Stadium.

Game results and trophy winners
In the event of a shared award, the previous year's winner retains custody of the trophy.

 
Five shared trophies, last in 2021
Only tie was in 1981 (Army–Navy, 3–3)
Overtime for Division I-A regular season introduced in 1996
Five OT games, three between Navy (2–1) and Air Force, one between Army (1–0) and Air Force, and one between Army (1–0) and Navy.

See also
Army–Navy Game
Commander's Classic
Secretaries Cup – annual Division III rivalry game between the Coast Guard Bears and Merchant Marine Mariners

References

College football rivalry trophies in the United States
Army Black Knights football
Navy Midshipmen football
Air Force Falcons football
Army–Navy Game
Military competitions in American football